This is the discography of British 2-tone/ska band Bad Manners.

Albums

Studio albums

Live albums

Compilation albums

Video albums

EPs

Singles

References

Discographies of British artists